The 1947 municipal election was held November 5, 1947 to elect a mayor and five aldermen to sit on Edmonton City Council and four trustees to sit on the public school board, while four trustees were acclaimed to the separate school board.  Voters also voted on two plebiscites, one of which approved two-year mayoral terms.  Accordingly, Harry Ainlay's election made him the first mayor of Edmonton to serve a two-year term.

There were ten aldermen on city council, but five of the positions were already filled: Sidney Bowcott, Athelstan Bissett (SS), Sidney Parsons, James Ogilvie, and Frederick John Mitchell were all elected to two-year terms in 1946 and were still in office.

There were seven trustees on the public school board, but three of the positions were already filled: James MacDonald, John Morrison, and Robert Rae had been elected to two-year terms in 1946 and were still in office.  The same was true on the separate board, where Adrian Crowe (SS), Francis Killeen, and James O'Hara were continuing.

Voter turnout

There were 18,676 ballots cast out of 76,112 eligible voters, for a voter turnout of 24.5%.

Results

 bold or  indicates elected
 italics indicate incumbent
 "SS", where data is available, indicates representative for Edmonton's South Side, with a minimum South Side representation instituted after the city of Strathcona, south of the North Saskatchewan River, amalgamated into Edmonton on February 1, 1912.

Mayor

Aldermen

Public school trustees

Separate (Catholic) school trustees

Weldon Bateman (SS), Joseph Gallant, Thomas Malone, and Joseph Pilon were acclaimed.

Plebiscites

 Financial plebiscite items required a minimum two-thirds "Yes" majority to bring about action

Mayoral Term

Are you in favour of a two-year term for Mayor?
Yes - 9,959
No - 8,312

Civic Auditorium/Art and Recreation Centre

Shall the Council pass a bylaw to create a debt in the sum of $1,500,00.00 for the purpose of constructing, within the City of Edmonton, a municipal building to be used as a Civic Auditorium and an Art and Recreation Centre and issue serial debentures in the sum not exceeding 30 years with interest not exceeding 4% payable semi-annually?
Yes - 4,362
No - 4,105

References

Election History, City of Edmonton: Elections and Census Office

1947
1947 elections in Canada
1947 in Alberta